Acacia aprica, or blunt wattle,  is a shrub belonging to the genus Acacia and the subgenus Juliflorae. It is native to the Wheatbelt region of Western Australia.

Description
It flowers from June to July producing yellow flowers. The plant will grown in red loam, sand or gravel soils and is often found on the plains or rocky hills. Also known as Blunt Wattle.

Distribution

It grows in Beard’s Province: South-West Province, and in the IBRA regions: Avon Wheatbelt, Geraldton Sandplains.

Endangered species
It is listed as critically endangered under the Wildlife Conservation Act of Western Australia, and as endangered on the IUCN redlist. and under the Commonwealth environmental protection act.

It is mainly found on roadside verges and in small areas of remnant native vegetation within farmland, giving rise to the following threats:
 disturbance from road and firebreak maintenance; 
 chemical drift from fertilisers and herbicides;
 competition from weeds; and
  inappropriate fire regimes

See also
 List of Acacia species

References

aprica
Acacias of Western Australia
Plants described in 1999
Taxa named by Bruce Maslin